Masami Yoshida may refer to:

, Japanese javelin thrower
, Japanese sprinter